On 29 December 1971, 55-year-old businessman and gold bar smuggler Ngo Cheng Poh, together with his two employees Ang Boon Chai, 57, and Leong Chin Woo, 51, were murdered by a group of 10 men. The group had also robbed the three men of 120 gold bars worth $500,000. This case was known as the Gold Bars Triple Murders. Seven of the 10 men were sentenced to death and executed for murder, while the remaining three were placed under indefinite detention.

Background and crime
This robbery and murder was hatched by 25-year-old Andrew Chou Hock Guan, who was formerly in business with Ngo's and several other gold bar syndicates to smuggle and transport gold bars from Vietnam into Singapore through the Vietnamese flights bound for Singapore. Chou, who started this job in early 1971, later lost the trust of the syndicates when he lost US$235,000, the money meant for the syndicates' funding in the business (later, Chou managed to recover US$180,000, but the rest cannot be recovered). Frustrated with the loss of trust from the syndicates, Chou hatched a plan to rob one of the syndicates still in contact with him. He hired his 34-year-old elder brother David Chou Hock Heng, and two friends—Peter Lim Swee Guan, 24; Augustine Ang Cheng Siong, 25—to plan the robbery and murder. Six youths—Alex Yau Hean Thye, 19; Stephen Francis, 20; Richard James, 18; Konesekaram s/o Nagalingam, 18; Stephen Lee Hock Khoon, 16; and Ringo Lee Chiew Chwee, 16—were hired by both Lim and Ang to do the killing, with the promise to pay $20,000 to each boy. These above batch of teen killers were not the first hired by the Chou brothers and Lim and Ang. Before that, the four masterminds had in fact gathered a batch of five youths to help do the killing. They include both Alex Yau and Stephen Lee and three other youths—Ringo Lee's elder brother Fernando Lee Beng Hong, Soh Ah Seng and a third boy only known as "Anchor". But subsequently, the latter three backed out of the plan.

After the trio entered the house and passed the gold to the Chou brothers, the killers then made their move and restrained Ngo and his two employees, and used a rope to strangle both Ngo Cheng Poh and Leong Chin Woo; Ang Boon Chai was being bludgeoned and strangled as well. The men's bodies were eventually found in a jungle by a group of soldiers and NSmen (National Servicemen) training in that forest itself. Not only that, Andrew Chou also contacted Ngo's widow Goh Cheng Hong, lying to her that her husband had not arrived at his house with the gold. Fearful for her husband's life, and not realising that her husband was already dead, Mdm Goh contacted the police. Following the investigations, the group of 10 were later arrested and charged with murder, while the stolen gold bars were later recovered by the police.

Trial and ruling

Augustine Ang's confession and discharge
Among the 10 men, only Augustine Ang confessed to his role in the murder and robbery, truthfully admitting that he was a part of the plot to murder and rob the three men. He also admitted that he used a wooden pole to beat Ang Boon Chai during the murders. Ang was thus given a discharge not amounting to an acquittal, and consequently, for his participation in the murder, Ang was detained indefinitely without trial. Ang later became the prosecution's key witness against all the nine accused persons, who stood trial before High Court judges Choor Singh and F. A. Chua (Frederick Arthur Chua) in the High Court in October 1972. The nine men pleaded not guilty to the triple murder charges.

The fates of the nine defendants
At the trial, the Chou brothers asserted that Ang was the mastermind of the robbery and murder, while the others stated they only helped to dispose or transport the bodies, even claiming ignorance to the robbery and murder. One of them, Alex Yau also said that he only helped transport the bodies. After a trial lasting around 40 days, on 4 December 1972, the judges rejected the testimonies of all the nine defendants while they accepted that the prosecution witness Augustine Ang was telling the truth, determining Andrew Chou as the mastermind and the equal roles played by all nine in the triple murder. All were found guilty of murder; however, out of the nine accused, seven of them (including the Chou brothers) were sentenced to death. The two remaining people—Stephen Lee and Ringo Lee—escaped the death penalty as they were both under the age of 18 at the time of the murders; both of them were detained indefinitely at the President's Pleasure. The subsequent appeals made by the seven condemned to the Court of Appeal and the Privy Council in London against their sentences (in which their respective lawyers argued that Ang's testimony should not be trusted); and their pleas to President Benjamin Sheares for clemency were all met with failure. On 28 February 1975, the seven men were hanged in Changi Prison, with more than 200 relatives of the seven men waiting outside the jail to claim the bodies.

Aftermath

Re-enactments
The case was re-enacted on Crimewatch in 1993, in English and Chinese. It was also re-enacted on True Files, a Singaporean crime show. It first aired as the first episode of the show's first season on 23 April 2002. It is currently viewable via meWATCH.

Fates of Augustine Ang, Stephen Lee and Ringo Lee
In these sources, the fates of Augustine Ang, Stephen Lee and Ringo Lee were told of. At the time of 1993, Ang and Ringo Lee were released from prison after spending more than 10 years in jail (16 years for Ang and 17 years for Ringo Lee) while Stephen Lee was still in prison serving his sentence. However, the English version of Crimewatch had wrongly stated that Stephen Lee was released while Ringo Lee is still in prison. This error was corrected in the Chinese version of Crimewatch.

In True Files, there is more light shed to the fates of the three men. Private investigator and former CID police officer Lionel De Souza, who was in charge of the case at that time, appeared on screen to be interviewed. He revealed that he met both Ang and Ringo Lee after their release. He stated that Ang was married and working as a store keeper, and has reformed into a soft-spoken and well-mannered person, though it is not known if he had any children (De Souza erroneously stated that Ang was jailed for 14 years under indefinite detention while recounting his encounters with Ang). He added that when he coincidentally run into Ringo Lee around two years before the time of his interview, he could not recognise him until Ringo Lee, who first called out to him, introduced himself; though there is nothing known about Ringo Lee's life—his job, whether he was married or had children etc.—after his release.

As for Stephen Lee, De Souza also said that according to his fellow police officers from the prison, Stephen Lee was "quite a mischievous guy", which was why he was not given an early release like Ringo Lee, which implied that Stephen Lee was possibly released from prison at this point of time. Similarly, like Ringo Lee, there was also no details of Stephen Lee's life after his presumed release from prison. Since then, there is nothing more known about the fates or whereabouts of the three men; if they were still alive as of now, they were probably in their sixties and seventies.

Publication
The Gold bars murders was considered as a notable crime that shook Singapore. In July 2015, Singapore's national daily newspaper The Straits Times published an e-book titled Guilty as Charged: 25 Crimes That Have Shaken Singapore Since 1965, which included the Gold Bars triple murders as one of the top 25 crimes that shocked the nation since its independence in 1965. The book was borne out of collaboration between the Singapore Police Force and the newspaper itself. The e-book was edited by ST News Associate editor Abdul Hafiz bin Abdul Samad. The paperback edition of the book was published and first hit the bookshelves in end-June 2017. The paperback edition first entered the ST bestseller list on 8 August 2017, a month after its publication.

See also
 2010 Kallang slashing
 Andrew Road triple murders
 Capital punishment in Singapore
 Kovan double murders
 Murder of Huang Na
 Murder of Nonoi
 Oriental Hotel murder
 The President's Pleasure
 Toa Payoh ritual murders

References

Cited works

Citations 

1971 murders in Singapore
Capital murder cases
Murder in Singapore
People murdered in Singapore
Singaporean people convicted of murder